In United States conservation policy, Major Land Resource Areas (MLRA) are geographically associated land resource units delineated by the Natural Resources Conservation Service and characterized by a particular pattern that combines soils, water, climate, vegetation, land use, and type of farming.

References 

Nature conservation in the United States